Robyn Maher  (born 6 October 1959) is a retired female basketball player from Australia, who played for the Sydney Uni Flames. A three-time Olympian she was a member of the national women's team that won the bronze medal at the 1996 Summer Olympics in Atlanta, Georgia.

Maher was appointed a Member of the Order of Australia (AM) in the 2002 Australia Day Honours in recognition of her "service to basketball as a player and administrator, and for the promotion of the sport among young people". In 2006, Maher was inducted into the Australian Basketball Hall of Fame. In October 2018, she was inducted into the Sport Australia Hall of Fame.

Personal life
Maher is married to former Opals coach Tom Maher. Her brother is a former Victorian Football League player Stewart Gull. Their father, Jim Gull, also played league football.

See also
 WNBL All-Star Five
 WNBL Defensive Player of the Year Award

References

1959 births
Living people
Australian women's basketball players
Basketball players at the 1984 Summer Olympics
Basketball players at the 1988 Summer Olympics
Basketball players at the 1996 Summer Olympics
Olympic basketball players of Australia
Olympic bronze medalists for Australia
Sportspeople from Ballarat
Olympic medalists in basketball
Sydney Uni Flames players
Members of the Order of Australia
Sport Australia Hall of Fame inductees
Medalists at the 1996 Summer Olympics